Kyla began her career in 2000 with EMI Music (Philippines). Her first album, Way to Your Heart, produced her most successful single to date, "Hanggang Ngayon". The song won numerous awards including the 2001 MTV Video Music Award for International Viewer's Choice for Southeast Asia making Kyla the first and only Filipino female artist to have won at the MTV Video Music Awards.

Known as the Philippines' "Queen of R&B," she has collaborated with many international artists such as American R&B singers Brian McKnight and Keith Martin, British boy band Blue, Irish musician Ronan Keating, Norwegian band Fra Lippo Lippi, Indonesian R&B singer Joeniar Arief, and Malaysian artists Too Phat, Noryn Aziz, Ferhad, and Hazami. The RX 93.1 Awards also recognized her as the "OPM Female Artist of the Decade".

Since her debut, Kyla has released a total of eight studio albums, all of which were certified Platinum albums. Kyla is currently managed by Cornerstone Talent Management Center and Star Music

Albums

Studio albums

Extended play

Compilation albums

Singles

As lead artist

As featured artist

Music videos

Soundtracks

Miscellaneous appearances

References

Discographies of Filipino artists